Rayol-Canadel-sur-Mer is a commune in the Var department in the Provence-Alpes-Côte d'Azur region in southeastern France. It comprises two small villages: Le Rayol and Canadel. They are situated along the D559 which goes along the coast at an average distance of approximately 200 metres from the sea. Rayol-Canadel-Sur-Mer is in between Cavaliere and Cavalaire-sur-mer. There are villas above and below the road on the hillside facing the sea and there is a view of L'Ile du Levant and L'Ile de Port-Cros.

Beaches
It has one beach at Canadel and another at Le Rayol. Carla Bruni, model, singer and wife of former French President Nicolas Sarkozy, visited the beach at Canadel before she became famous. For many years until 2007, there was a swimming race around the headland from one beach to the other but it was stopped after health and safety concerns. Every year there is a fireworks display on 15 August to celebrate when Allied troops landed on the beaches during World War II to liberate France in Operation Dragoon.

Domaine du Rayol
The Domaine du Rayol is the most popular attraction in the village and contains gardens of plants from around the world.

See also
Communes of the Var department

References

Communes of Var (department)
Populated coastal places in France